Pilodeudorix kiellandi, the Kielland's diopetes, is a butterfly in the family Lycaenidae. It is found in Sierra Leone, Ivory Coast, Ghana, Cameroon, the Republic of the Congo, the north-eastern part of the Democratic Republic of the Congo and north-western Tanzania.

References

Butterflies described in 1998
Deudorigini